KidsPeace is an American private charity serving the behavioral and mental health needs of children, families and communities. Founded in 1882, it operates a psychiatric hospital, a range of residential treatment programs, educational services, foster care offices  and a variety of community-based treatment programs.

KidsPeace offers services in Georgia, Indiana, Maine, Maryland, New York, North Carolina, Pennsylvania, and Virginia.

KidsPeace was founded by the president of the predecessor to Bethlehem Steel Corporation, William Thurston, in response to a smallpox epidemic that had left many children in south Bethlehem, Pennsylvania, orphaned and homeless. Afterwards, the organization came to be known as "Wiley House" and remained so for many years, until it officially changed its name to "KidsPeace" in January 1992.

Treatment programs

KidsPeace provides a range of services to children in need of mental and behavioral health treatment, and to their families.

The largest KidsPeace facility is its Orchard Hills Campus in Orefield, outside of Allentown, Pennsylvania. This 262-acre (106 ha) campus includes an inpatient children’s psychiatric hospital and several residential treatment programs. It also has amenities such as an Olympic-sized swimming pool, ropes course, apple orchard, playgrounds, gym with wrap-around track, multiple athletic fields, and recreation lounges. To educate the children in its care, KidsPeace utilizes its own private schools, staffed with specially trained teachers.

At its Graham Lake Campus in Maine, KidsPeace provides residential treatment, autism spectrum disorders residential treatment, therapeutic day treatment, and a licensed, approved special-purpose school. It has five other offices around the state to provide services like foster care, a supported families program, a family visitation program, and outpatient mental health services.

In Georgia, the KidsPeace Bowdon Campus is a 70-bed residential facility, with a separate unit that houses males aged 12–17 with sexual issues. The Georgia operation also provides therapeutic outpatient services. The on-site KidsPeace School of Georgia is accredited through the Carroll County School System by the Southern Accreditation of Colleges and Schools (SACS).

In 2015, KidsPeace School of Georgia received Bronze level recognition by U.S. News & World Reports listing of the best high schools in the nation.

KidsPeace also provides foster care and community programs services through offices in Maine, New York, Pennsylvania, Maryland, Virginia, North Carolina, and Indiana. In 2016 the organization started Orchard Behavioral Health, an initiative to provide outpatient services for adults aged 21 to 65.

KidsPeace is accredited by the Joint Commission in Georgia, North Carolina and Pennsylvania, and the Middle States Association of Colleges and Schools.

KidsPeace does not discriminate in regard to admissions in terms of sex, race, creed, color, national origin, LEP (Limited English Proficiency), religious beliefs, disabilities, or handicapping conditions.

According to the organization’s annual report, in 2018 KidsPeace served nearly 10,000 clients through its various programs. Since 1882, it has treated more than 200,000 children and adults in need.

Concerns over care of clients
In 1993, Dean Sine, a counselor in the Orefield, Pennsylvania, facility, restrained a 12-year-old boy by sitting on his buttocks and then lower back. The boy reported that he couldn't breathe, but the restraint was continued until after he was unresponsive, when it was discovered that he had stopped breathing. Resuscitation attempts failed, and the counselor was subsequently charged and acquitted of homicide in criminal court in 1995.

On February 21, 2002, a resident of Kidspeace's Orfield, PA campus took her own life. Chloe Cohen of Betsy Ross House hung herself while being placed on "suicide watch" to ensure her safety.

In 2007, admissions to KidsPeace were halted by state officials due to seven children sustaining broken bones while being restrained by KidsPeace staff. Admissions resumed in December 2007 after KidsPeace implemented new policies on use of restraints and restricting admission of violent and aggressive clients into the program.

In April 2008, two 16-year-old girls accessed a counselor's supply of methadone pills in her car. The girls took a total of 28 pills, resulting in one fatally overdosing and another being partially paralyzed. They were being given a ride home from a group home for children with drug problems.

Financial issues, pension default, and bankruptcy
As of 2010, the pension plan for KidsPeace was underfunded by $42 million. In January 2012, it failed to make a $1.4 million bond payment. In March 2012, a lien was filed against KidsPeace for failing to contribute $3 million to its retirement plan. As a partial result, Moody's downgraded KidsPeace's bond rating to a C.

In May 2013, KidsPeace filed for Chapter 11 bankruptcy. The filing listed organizational debts totaling nearly $249 million, including nearly $100 million in unfunded pension obligations. Also in May 2013, the Pension Benefit Guarantee Corporation assumed control of the KidsPeace pension plan after KidsPeace officials defaulted on making required payments.

KidsPeace emerged from bankruptcy protection in July 2014.

References

External links
Kidspeace.org - official KidsPeace website

Health charities in the United States
Medical and health organizations based in Pennsylvania